Lukovka is a rural locality (a selo) and the administrative center of Lukovsky Selsoviet, Pankrushikhinsky District, Altai Krai, Russia. The population was 699 as of 2013. There are 5 streets.

Geography 
Lukovka is located 12 km north of Pankrushikha (the district's administrative centre) by road. Velizhanka is the nearest rural locality.

References 

Rural localities in Pankrushikhinsky District